Gustav Isaak (born 8 March 1989) is a Namibian footballer who plays as a midfielder for African Stars and the Namibia national football team.

References

1989 births
Living people
Namibian men's footballers
People from ǁKaras Region
Association football midfielders
SK Windhoek players
Orlando Pirates S.C. players
United Africa Tigers players
African Stars F.C. players
Namibia international footballers
Namibia A' international footballers
2020 African Nations Championship players
Expatriate soccer players in South Africa
Namibian expatriate footballers
Namibian expatriate sportspeople in South Africa